Edna Cecil Cunningham (August 2, 1888 – April 17, 1959) was an American film and stage actress, singer, and comedienne.

Early years
Cunningham started her working life as a switchboard operator in a commerce bank and did some sittings as a photographer's model. Her early experience in music came as a member of the choir in the Fifth Baptist Church in St. Louis.

Career

Cunningham's first show business job was in the chorus line of Mlle. Modiste at the age of 18. She trained as a singer and appeared in opera. She worked as a vaudeville comedian at the Palace Theatre in New York City until the commencement of her movie career in 1929.

A. L. Erlanger selected her for the title role in the original production of The Pink Lady.

Cunningham's Broadway credits include Somewhere Else (1913), Iolanthe (1913), Oh, I Say! (1913), Maids of Athens (1914), Dancing Around (1914), Greenwich Village Follies (1919), The Rose of China (1919), and Dance With Your Gods (1934). She also performed in Paris with the Boston Grand Opera Company, singing in Italian operas.

Cunningham was a Hollywood character actress with whitish hair cut like a man's, often in roles as a general "know-it-all". She made more than 80 appearances in movies between 1929 and 1946, many of them uncredited.

Personal life
Cunningham was married to writer Jean C. Havez from 1915 to 1917.

Death
On April 17, 1959, Cunningham died of heart disease at the Motion Picture Country Hospital in Woodland Hills, California. She was 70 years old. Her remains are interred in Chapel of the Pines Crematory.

Complete filmography

 Their Own Desire (1929) - Aunt Caroline
 Paramount on Parade (1930) - Society Woman (Impulses) (uncredited)
 Anybody's Woman (1930) - Dot
 Playboy of Paris (1930) - Mlle. Hedwige
 Trouble from Abroad (1931, Short) - Emma Wimple
 Monkey Business (1931) - Madame Swempski (uncredited)
 Susan Lenox (Her Fall and Rise) (1931) - Madame Panoramia aka Pansy
 The Age for Love (1931) - Pamela
 Safe in Hell (1931) - Angie
 Mata Hari (1931) - Gambler Selling Ring (uncredited)
 Never the Twins Shall Meet (1932, Short) - Mrs. Carp
 Impatient Maiden (1932) - Mrs. Rosy
 The Wet Parade (1932) - Mrs. Twombey - Hotel Guest (uncredited)
 It's Tough to Be Famous (1932) - Autograph Seeker with Sheet Music (uncredited)
 Just a Pain in the Parlor (1932, Short) - Mrs. Smith
 The Rich Are Always with Us (1932) - Woman Talking to Tierney at Party (uncredited)
 Love Is a Racket (1932) - Aunt Hattie Donovan
 Is My Face Red? (1932) - Millionaire's Blonde Wife (uncredited)
 The Candid Camera (1932, Short) - Mrs. Townes' Aunty
 Love Me Tonight (1932) - Laundress (uncredited)
 Those We Love (1932) - Mrs. Henry Abbott
 Blonde Venus (1932) - Norfolk Woman Manager (uncredited)
 If I Had a Million (1932) - Agnes - Emily's Friend (uncredited)
 Ladies They Talk About (1933) - Mrs. Arlington (uncredited)
 From Hell to Heaven (1933) - Mrs. Chadman
 The Druggist's Dilemma (1933, Short) - Mrs. Finch
 Bottoms Up (1934) - Party Guest (uncredited)
 Manhattan Love Song (1934) - Pancake Annie Jones
 The Life of Vergie Winters (1934) - Pearl Turner
 Return of the Terror (1934) - Miss Doolittle
 We Live Again (1934) - Theodosia (uncredited)
 People Will Talk (1935) - Nellie Simpson
 Mr. Deeds Goes to Town (1936) - Minor Role (uncredited)
 Come and Get It (1936) - Josie
 Swing High, Swing Low (1937) - Murphy
 King of Gamblers (1937) - Big Edna
 Artists and Models (1937) - Stella
 This Way Please (1937) - Miss Eberhardt
 The Awful Truth (1937) - Mrs. Alvin
 Daughter of Shanghai (1937) - Mrs. Mary Hunt
 Scandal Street (1938) - Maybelle Murphy
 Four Men and a Prayer (1938) - Piper
 College Swing (1938) - Dean Sleet
 Kentucky Moonshine (1938) - Landlady
 You and Me (1938) - Mrs. Morris
 Wives Under Suspicion (1938) - 'Sharpy'
 Blond Cheat (1938) - Genevieve Trent
 Marie Antoinette (1938) - Mme. 'Feldy' de Lerchenfeld (uncredited)
 Girls' School (1938) - Miss Brewster
 The Family Next Door (1939) - Cora Stewart
 It's a Wonderful World (1939) - Madame J.L. Chambers
 Winter Carnival (1939) - Miss Ainsley
 Lady of the Tropics (1939) - Countess Berichi
 Laugh It Off (1939) - Tess Gibson
 Abe Lincoln in Illinois (1940) - Minor Role (uncredited)
 Lillian Russell (1940) - Mrs. Hobbs
 The Captain Is a Lady (1940) - Mrs. Jane Homans
 New Moon (1940) - Governor's Wife
 Kitty Foyle (1940) - Grandmother
 Tall, Dark and Handsome (1941) - Frosty's Landlady (uncredited)
 Play Girl (1941) - Dowager (uncredited)
 Back Street (1941) - Mrs. Miller
 Repent at Leisure (1941) - Mrs. Morgan
 Hurry, Charlie, Hurry (1941) - Mrs. Diana Boone
 Blossoms in the Dust (1941) - Mrs. Gilworth
 The Feminine Touch (1941) - Party Guest (uncredited)
 Cowboy Serenade (1942) - Priscilla Smythe
 The Wife Takes a Flyer (1942) - Countess Oldenburg
 Twin Beds (1942) - Miss MacMahon, Secretary (uncredited)
 Are Husbands Necessary? (1942) - Miss Jenkins
 The Affairs of Martha (1942) - Mrs. Llewellyn Castle
 I Married an Angel (1942) - Mrs. Fairmind (uncredited)
 Cairo (1942) - Mme. Laruga
 The Hidden Hand (1942) - Lorinda Channing
 My Heart Belongs to Daddy (1942) - Mrs. Whitman (uncredited)
 Above Suspicion (1943) - Countess
 In Old Oklahoma (1943) - Mrs. Ames
 The Horn Blows at Midnight (1945) - Judge Cavendish (scenes deleted)
 Wonder Man (1945) - Fortune Teller (uncredited)
 My Reputation (1946) - Mrs. Stella Thompson
 The Bride Goes Wild (1948) - Helen Oldfield (scenes deleted)
 Joyful Hour (1960, TV movie) - Elizabeth

References

External links

1888 births
1959 deaths
American film actresses
American stage actresses
Burials at Chapel of the Pines Crematory
Actresses from St. Louis
20th-century American actresses
Baptists from the United States